Preston Manor may refer to:
Preston, London, also known as Preston Manor
Preston Manor High School
Preston Manor, Brighton

See also
Preston House (disambiguation)